North Grove is a resort village in the Canadian province of Saskatchewan within Census Division No. 6. It is on the shores of Buffalo Pound Lake in the Rural Municipality of Dufferin No. 190.

History 
North Grove incorporated as a resort village on January 1, 1989.

Demographics 

Government 
The Resort Village of North Grove is governed by an elected municipal council and an appointed administrator. The mayor is Sherry Hetherington and its administrator is Tracy Edwards.

See also 
List of communities in Saskatchewan
List of municipalities in Saskatchewan
List of resort villages in Saskatchewan
List of villages in Saskatchewan
List of summer villages in Alberta

References 

Resort villages in Saskatchewan
Dufferin No. 190, Saskatchewan
Division No. 6, Saskatchewan